The Diocese of Vyatka and Slobodskoy (Vyatskaya i Slobodskaya yeparkhiya) is a diocese of the Russian Orthodox Church which covers the exact territory of Kirov Oblast, Russia. The Assumption Cathedral in the region's capital, Kirov, is the Mother Church of this diocese.

It is headed by Archbishop Mark (Tuzhikov) and supported by the Moscow Patriarchate.

The diocese of Vyatka and Great Perm was established in 1656.

External links 
 Vyatka-Slobodskoy Diocese official website

Eparchies of the Russian Orthodox Church
Culture of Kirov Oblast
Dioceses established in the 17th century
1656 establishments in Russia